John C. Gaeta (born 1965) is a designer and inventor best known for his work on the Matrix film trilogy, where he advanced methods and formats known as Bullet Time.

Career
John Gaeta was born in New York City and grew up in Shoreham, Long Island; he entered New York University's Tisch School of the Arts to study film, and acquired a BFA degree with honors in 1989. He was introduced to the industry as a staff production assistant for the Saturday Night Live film unit, as well as doing camera and lighting work for a variety of media types and makers. Some of  these early work experiences included holography with Jason Sapan, stop-motion animation with Peter Wallach, motion control with Bran Ferren, nature documentary, filming birdlife for National Geographic Explorer, timelapse and experimental photography in Namibia, Africa on Miramax's first feature, Dust Devil.

After co-supervising development for 3-D paint effect stylizations and LIDAR laser scanning(Reality Capture) for What Dreams May Come (1998 Visual Effects Oscar winner), Gaeta began his first solo effects supervision project for The Wachowskis' science fiction film, The Matrix.

In 2000, Gaeta won Best Visual Effects at the 73rd Academy Awards for his work on The Matrix, alongside Janek Sirrs, Steve Courtley and Jon Thum. The same year, Gaeta was brought on as the senior visual effects supervisor to complete the Matrix trilogy including The Matrix Reloaded and The Matrix Revolutions. This pair of films were created in parallel and featured over 2000 visual effects shots. Many photographed and post processed at a custom built complex called ESC, located at the Alameda Naval Base near San Francisco. Overall conceptual design as well as research and development was initiated for the final two installments in January 2000. There were a wide range of effects content from large-scale man vs. machine-type battles, to anime-styled hyper-real moments. The centerpiece innovations and new methodologies presented through the Matrix universe was the creation of "Virtual Cinematography" and "Virtual Effects," phrases coined by Gaeta in 1999 and 2000.

In 2022, Gaeta took the role of Chief Creative Officer at Inworld AI, a company that powers the memories, behavior, and dialogue of AI NPCs and characters.

Awards
 2000 Academy Award for Visual Effects, for The Matrix
 2000 BAFTA Awards for Best Achievement in Special Effects, for The Matrix
Above two shared with Steve Courtley, Janek Sirrs, Jon Thum
 2000 MTV Movie Award, Best Action 
 2003 Visual Effects Society Award for Best Single Visual Effect of the Year in Any Medium, for The Matrix Reloaded (trailer "Top Crash"), shared with Dan Glass, Adrian De Wet, Greg Juby
 2003 Visual Effects Society Award for Outstanding Visual Effects Photography in a Motion Picture for The Matrix Reloaded (U-cap facial photography), shared with Kim Libreri, George Borshukov, Paul Ryan
 Hollywood Film Festival: Hollywood Visual Effects Award, 2003 
 Nominated, 2003 Visual Effects Society Award for Outstanding Visual Effects in a Visual Effects Driven Motion Picture for The Matrix Revolutions, shared with Kim Libreri, George Murphy, Craig Hayes
 2014 Palo Alto International Film Festival, Muybridge Award for Innovation

References

External links
 

1965 births
People from Suffolk County, New York
Best Visual Effects Academy Award winners
Best Visual Effects BAFTA Award winners
Living people
Special effects people
Visual effects supervisors
New York University alumni
People from New York City